is a video game developed by Sega in 1988 for the Master System. It is a sequel to the original Space Harrier.

Plot
The Space Harrier returns to stop an evil tyrant from corrupting the peaceful Land of the Dragons by finding Euria, the missing heir to the throne. The player character can run across the ground or fly using his flight belt. There are twelve game stages, and the player fights an evil captain at the end of each stage. After completing all 13 stages, the player must then fight each of the captains, one at a time in sequence; after that, the evil king then comes after the player to prevent the player from ending his tyranny over the Land of the Dragons.

Gameplay
Space Harrier 3-D is a fast-paced three-dimensional action game. Like the original, the game involves a superhuman hero who runs and flies towards a forever distant background on a checkerboard-styled ground. As the playing field moves forward, enemies come from behind and from the far distance to attack the character, by either firing a projectile or trying to crash into him. The player must also dodge large objects in his path, some of which can be destroyed. One hit from an enemy or a crash into these large objects will cause the player to lose a life.

Playing the game requires the SegaScope 3-D Glasses. Upon achieving a high score to input a name, a cheat code is available in the game to disable the 3-D effects, which is difficult to achieve without the glasses due to the distortion caused by the 3-D effects.

Reception
The game was reviewed in 1989 in Dragon #144 by Hartley, Patricia, and Kirk Lesser in "The Role of Computers" column. The reviewers gave the game 4.5 out of 5 stars.

Reviews
 Computer and Video Games - Jun, 1988
 Tilt - Jul, 1988
 ASM (Aktueller Software Markt) - Nov, 1988

Port
The game was later ported for 3DS by M2 and released as a part of Sega 3D Fukkoku Archives on 18 December 2014.

References

External links
Space Harrier 3-D at IGN

Space Harrier 3-D at Giant Bomb

1988 video games
Master System games
Master System-only games
Rail shooters
Sega video games
Single-player video games
Video game sequels
Video games developed in Japan
Video games with stereoscopic 3D graphics

ja:スペースハリアー#続編・関連タイトル